Likhi may refer to :

 Places
 The Likhi Range, in Georgia, Transcaucasia
 Likhi State, a former princely state in Mahi Kantha, Gujarat, western India